Animaritime is an anime and gaming convention founded by members of the Mount Allison University anime club.

The convention was first held as an anime-only convention on the university campus in Sackville, New Brunswick in 2004. It was the first anime con to be held in the Canadian Maritimes. 2010 festivities consisted of two smaller conventions called Animinitime, each a one-day con, located in Halifax, Nova Scotia and Moncton, New Brunswick. Animaritime moved to Fredericton, New Brunswick for the 2013 convention.

History

Event history

References

External links
Official websites:
Animaritime website
Animinitime website

Anime conventions in Canada
Organizations based in Fredericton
2004 establishments in New Brunswick
Recurring events established in 2004